Come Come Come Upward is a 1989 South Korean film directed by Im Kwon-taek.

Plot
The film examines the lives of two young women linked by their affiliation with a Buddhist temple.

Accolades
Best Film: Grand Bell Awards
Best Actress, Bronze St. George (Kang Soo-yeon); 16th Moscow International Film Festival
Special Prize Im Kwon-taek; Moscow International Film Festival
Nominated
Golden St. George (Im Kwon-taek); Moscow International Film Festival

References

Sources

External links

Films directed by Im Kwon-taek
Best Picture Grand Bell Award winners
1980s Korean-language films
South Korean drama films